Tyreke Rieco Rogers (born December 5, 2001), known professionally as Lil Double 0, is an American rapper from Memphis, Tennessee. He is known for his album Walk Down World which peaked at number 175 on the Billboard 200. He is currently signed to American rapper Future's record label Freebandz.

Early life and personal life 
Lil Double 0 played basketball during his youth. He lost two of his closest friends, one to homicide and another to incarceration which pushed him to start a music career.

Career 
Lil Double 0 started rapping seriously at the age of 18. He received traction from singles such as "Living" and "007" which helped him grab the attention of record labels. He signed with American rapper Future in 2021. In September 2021, he released his single "U Selling Dope" with his manager and American rapper Future. In October 2022, he released a single with American rapper EST Gee titled "Fight That Switch" alongside a music video. In December 2022, he was arrested in Florida on gun and drug charges, he was released from jail and was put on house arrest a few weeks later.

Musical style 
Robby Seabrook III, writing for XXL describes his musical style in the following manner: "What's so distinct about Double 0 is he can do whatever cadence he wants while staying on the same train of thought and weaving together clever lyrics."

References

External links 
 

Living people
21st-century American rappers
2001 births
African-American male rappers
African-American male songwriters
Rappers from Memphis, Tennessee
People from Memphis, Tennessee
Songwriters from Tennessee
Trap musicians